Lieutenant General Sir Cedric Norman George Delves,  (born 1 March 1947) is a retired British Army officer and a former commander of the 22nd Special Air Service Regiment.

Military career
Delves was commissioned from the Royal Military Academy Sandhurst into the Devonshire and Dorset Regiment of the Prince of Wales's Division on 2 August 1968, and promoted lieutenant on 2 February 1970. Having been promoted to captain on 2 August 1974, he passed selection for the Special Air Service (SAS) and undertook tours in Northern Ireland for which he was Mentioned in Despatches in December 1979 for services between 1 May and 31 July 1979 and again in December 1981 for services between 1 May and 31 July 1981. Still serving with the Devonshire and Dorset Regiment, he was promoted major on 30 September 1980.

Falklands War
Delves distinguished himself on 21 April 1982 when, as Officer Commanding D Squadron 22nd Special Air Service Regiment, he captured Grytviken on South Georgia without loss of life. He followed this up on 15 May when his squadron destroyed eleven Argentine aircraft at Pebble Island (the Raid on Pebble Island), on 21 May when he led a deceptive raid on Darwin, and again on 31 May at Mount Kent in the Falkland Islands where he took his squadron 40 miles behind enemy lines and secured a firm hold on the area allowing conventional forces to be brought in. 

For his leadership during these operations, Delves was awarded the Distinguished Service Order. His citation, published in the London Gazette, reads:

Later career
Serving with the Devonshire and Dorset Regiment, Delves was promoted lieutenant colonel on 30 June 1986. He succeeded Lieutenant Colonel Andrew Massey as commander of 22nd Special Air Service Regiment, when British Special Forces carried out the Death on the Rock operation which resulted in the death of three Provisional Irish Republican Army bombers in Gibraltar. Appointed an Officer of the Order of the British Empire on 15 June 1990, Delves was promoted colonel fifteen days later, and soon afterwards on 31 December 1990 promoted brigadier.

In 1993, Delves was appointed Director Special Forces and, by December 1995, he was leading Special Operations in Bosnia as Commander of the Combined Joint Special Operations Task Force (CJSOTF), a component of the Implementation Force (IFOR).

Delves was appointed General Officer Commanding 3rd (UK) Division and promoted major general on 5 July 1996, in which role he was deployed to Bosnia in January 1998 as Commander of Multi-National Division (South-West). He was appointed a Commander of the Order of the British Empire on 31 December 1996, and awarded a Queen's Commendation for Valuable Service on 7 May 1999 for his service in former Yugoslavia between 22 June and 30 September 1998.

By 1999 Delves was Chief of Joint Forces Operational Readiness and Training. He became Deputy Commander-in-Chief at Land Command (subsequently retitled 'Commander Field Army') in the rank of lieutenant general in December 2000. On 1 April 2001, Delves was appointed Colonel Commandant of the Small Arms School Corps.

Delves was appointed the British representative to United States Central Command in Tampa, Florida for the War in Afghanistan on 17 January 2002. While at Central Command, American General Tommy Franks oversaw the military effort against al-Qaeda in Afghanistan. Delves had succeeded Air Marshal Jock Stirrup as focus changed from air operations to a campaign conducted largely by special forces on the ground. This appointment was just prior to the Invasion of Iraq, and Delves went on to be Deputy Commander at NATO HQ Allied Forces North at Brunssum in September 2003. On 31 December 2002 he was appointed Colonel of the Devonshire and Dorset Regiment. He was knighted as a Knight Commander of the Order of the British Empire in June 2003 and, on 1 October, was succeeded as Colonel Commandant of the Small Arms School Corps by Lieutenant General Sir Redmond Watt, Delves having been appointed Deputy Commander-in-Chief Regional Headquarters Allied Forces North Europe on 30 September 2003.

In December 2003, Delves lost a leg when he was crushed against a wall by a drunk driver in Maastricht in the Netherlands. He retired due to disability on 17 March 2005. and relinquished the appointment of Colonel of the Devonshire and Dorset Regiment on 1 February 2007 on formation of The Rifles.

Post-retirement
In retirement, Delves became a Director of Olive Group, a security business. In April 2006 he was appointed to oversee intelligence operations with the Serious Organised Crime Agency (SOCA) during the time of the merger of investigative services of the Customs and Police. He became Lieutenant of the Tower of London in March 2007, and was succeeded by Lieutenant-General Peter Pearson on 4 May 2010.

Delves joined the Board of Trustees of BLESMA in 2009 and was elected National Chairman in 2010.

Delves is also an accomplished photographer and regularly wins competitions.

Family
Delves is married to Suzy.

References

|-

|-

|-
 

1947 births
Living people
Graduates of the Royal Military Academy Sandhurst
British Army lieutenant generals
Knights Commander of the Order of the British Empire
Companions of the Distinguished Service Order
Recipients of the Commendation for Valuable Service
Devonshire and Dorset Regiment officers
British Army personnel of the Iraq War
British Army personnel of the Falklands War
Special Air Service officers
British amputees
British military personnel of The Troubles (Northern Ireland)
People from Singapore